Joseph Hirsch Dünner ( (also known as (הריצ״ד)); 11 January 1833 – 13 October 1911) was a Dutch Jewish leader and scholar, who served as Chief Rabbi of North Holland (including Amsterdam).

Biography
Dünner was born in Cracow, Poland, in 1833. He received his rabbinical education in his native city, and studied philosophy and Oriental philology at Bonn and Heidelberg. He received a PhD from the latter institution with a thesis on Abraham ibn Ezra.

His ability soon made it famous as a school of Jewish theology, ancient languages, and religious philosophy. In 1874 he was made Chief Rabbi of the Amsterdam community and of the province of North Holland, and though was strictly Orthodox, no dissension has marred his administration. The government recognized his ability and activity by decorating him with the Order of the Lion of the Netherlands.

Dünner is known for his studies on the Halakha of the Tannaic period, and by his disquisitions on the Tosefta. Dünner argued that the Tosefta was "a post-Talmudic compilation of Talmudic baraitot and authentic Tannaitic material" and was an important precursor to Hanoch Albeck's thesis concerning the Tosefta.  Additionally, Dünner's commentary to the Babylonian Talmud, republished as Ḥidushei ha-riṣad by Mossad HaRav Kook, was one of the first modern academic studies of Talmud.   Together with Meijer Roest, he founded the Nieuw Israëlietisch Weekblad (1865) and the Israëlietische Nieuwsbode (1875). He also acquired a reputation as an orator, and contributed to the Joodsch Letterkundige Bijdragen, Monatsschrift, Weekblad voor Israeliten, and Israelitische Letterbode.

Publications
 
 
 (Republished as Ḥidushei ha-riṣad) (Volumes 1,2,5,6,7, available via Hebrewbooks.org

References
 

1833 births
1911 deaths
19th-century Dutch rabbis
Chief rabbis of cities
Dutch Orthodox rabbis
Heidelberg University alumni
Polish emigrants to the Netherlands
Rabbis from Amsterdam
University of Bonn alumni
Writers from Amsterdam